Kingham Hill School is a Christian co-educational private day and boarding school for children aged 11–18, located near the village of Kingham in Oxfordshire. It was founded by local landowner Charles Young in 1886, with buildings designed by the architect William Howard Seth-Smith.

History
Kingham Hill was purpose built by the Christian philanthropist Charles Young in 1886. He put his faith into practice by establishing it as a place where boys with a boarding need could be educated and prepared for life. In the early days, the school was a virtually self-sufficient community. It had a farm, a wide range of workshops, a school building, a chapel, a sanatorium and various boarding houses. Young ensured that every Kingham boy learned their ‘letters’, gained a trade and could understand the Christian faith. On leaving they could progress to accommodation and opportunities in London or emigrate to a farm Young owned in Canada and make their life in the New World. The school became co-educational in 1992 when it welcomed its first intake of girls.

The Kingham Hill Trust, established by Young, administers the school and its sister foundation, Oak Hill Theological College in London.

School

Kingham Hill School is a small coeducational boarding school and day school for children aged 11–18, set in 100 acres of grounds in the heart of the Cotswold countryside. The school was founded in 1886 and has around 360 pupils split into eleven houses, seven of which are boarding and four for day pupils.

Facilities
The school has a performing arts theatre, sports centre, leisure centre, with a swimming pool, Turkish hamam, sauna, fitness suite as well as a dance and drama studio, astroturf, squash court and tennis courts on site. These facilities are available for use by the local community at certain times. In addition to the sports pitches, the school's 100 acres of grounds include parkland, 30 acres of woodland and 8 acres of pasture housing the school's horses, sheep, alpacas, pine martens and goats. The school has recently invested in new facilities including a £4 million maths and science building built in 2015, a new library completed in 2016 and a new £6 million sports centre opened in January 2020.

Boarding and day houses
 Plymouth is a junior boys boarding house. 
 Norwich is a senior boys boarding house.
 Bradford is a senior boys boarding house.
 Sheffield is a senior boys boarding house.
 Greenwich is a junior girls day and boarding house.
 Durham is a senior girls boarding house.
 Severn is a senior girls boarding house.
 Clyde is a junior boys day house.
 Havelock is a senior boys day house.
 Latimer is a senior girls day house. 
 Woodstock is a senior boys day house.

The Lodge houses the upper sixth girls in their own accommodation.

Notable alumni

Andrew Adonis, Baron Adonis, journalist and former Labour politician, Secretary of State for Transport, 2009-2010 
Bruce Arnold, writer
Guy Arnold traveller, writer
Matthew Bourne, composer and jazz musician
Lance Ellington, singer on Strictly Come Dancing
R. J. Ellory, award-winning crime writer
Martin Glover, known as "Youth". Music producer, bassist and member of Killing Joke.
Alex Paterson of The Orb 
Guy Pratt, bassist for Pink Floyd and for David Gilmour on stage, author of My Bass and other Animals, raconteur.
Terry Jones, graphic designer, art director, photographer, and editor of i-D magazine.
Mark Alexander, British artist
Luisa Neubauer, German climate activist

References

External links 
 School Website
 Profile on the Independent Schools Council website
 Photos of the school in the early 1980s

Church of England private schools in the Diocese of Oxford
Educational institutions established in 1886
Private schools in Oxfordshire
1886 establishments in England